Album is the debut album by American band Girls. It was released September 22, 2009 on True Panther Sounds.

Critical reception

Initial critical response to Album was extremely positive. At Metacritic, which assigns a normalized rating out of 100 to reviews from mainstream critics, the album has received an average score of 80, based on 22 reviews. Tom Breihan of Pitchfork writes, "Album is mostly sunny Beach Boys pastiche, but it's not the kajillionth indie attempt at orchestral Pet Sounds majesty. Rather, it's simple and forthright early Beach Boys stuff: compact guitar-jangles, sha-la-la harmonies, muffled heartbeat drums. It sounds great." Jason Lymangrover of AllMusic states, "As a whole, everything's relaxed and dreamy, perfectly matching the '70s aesthetic of their videos: washed out with overexposed sun streaks and a Crayola watercolor palette." Will Dean of The Guardian says, "The duo combine deceptively simple chords and patterns with hazy walls of feedback, Californian pop melodies, surf guitars and Owens's dozy vocal style – which sounds like he's answering a question you asked him yesterday. The result is glorious."

Accolades
Album was awarded the fifth spot on Spin magazine's best albums of 2009 list and tenth on Pitchforks "The Top 50 Albums of 2009" list. Pitchfork also awarded it "Best New Music" upon release.

Track listing

Personnel
Adapted from Discogs.
Chet "JR" White – producer, bass guitar
Tom Marzella – drums (track 10)
Garett Godard – drums (tracks 2, 3, 5, 12)
Myles Benham Cooper – beach sounds (track 7)
Christopher Owens – cover art, girls photos
Sandy Kim – band photography
John Goodmansos – mixing
John Golden – mastering

Charts

As of 2012 the album has sold 50,000 copies in United States according to Nielsen SoundScan.

Release history

References

External links

2009 debut albums
Girls (band) albums
True Panther Sounds albums
Albums produced by Chet "JR" White